Ewart Adamson (23 October 1882 – 28 November 1945) was a Scottish screenwriter.  He wrote for more than 120 films between 1922 and 1944. He was born in Dundee, Scotland, and died in Hollywood, California.

Selected filmography

 South of Suva (1922)
 The Silent Guardian (1925)
 Go Straight (1925)
 The Night Cry (1926)
 Flashing Fangs (1926)
 The Impostor (1926)
 The Jade Cup (1926)
 Flaming Fury (1926)
 Home Struck (1927)
 Not for Publication (1927)
 The Desert Bride (1928)
 Dead Man's Curve (1928)
 The Perfect Crime (1928)
 Barnum Was Right (1929)
 Niagara Falls (1932)
 Guests Wanted (1932)
 The Gold Ghost (1934)
 Allez Oop (1934)
 False Pretenses (1935)
 House of Errors (1942)
 Haunted Harbor (1944)

External links

1882 births
1945 deaths
Scottish screenwriters
Writers from Dundee
20th-century British dramatists and playwrights
Scottish male writers
20th-century British male writers
20th-century British writers
20th-century British screenwriters